Ferdinand Freiherr Rosenzweig von Drauwehr (July 11, 1812 – September 4, 1892) was an Austrian military officer and architect.

Biography
Rosenzweig was born in Eisenstadt in the Austrian Empire. He served first under Kaiser Franz Joseph I of Austria-Hungary and then under Emperor Maximilian I of Mexico.

He was married to Hungarian Princess Catarina Radzivil de Atavia, who was a lady in the court of Empress Carlota of Mexico. During his service to the Emperor of Mexico, he traced and built the current famous avenue Paseo de la Reforma, in that time called Paseo de la Emperatriz ("Promenade of the Empress"); and later renamed. After the fall of the Second Mexican Empire, during the post-Maximilian era, he built several other structures such as the Necaxa Ridge, which was Mexico City first source of electricity.

References

Sources
 Antonio Schmidt-Brentano: Die k.k. bzw. k.u.k. Generalität 1816-1918, Österreichisches Staatsarchiv, 2007, p. 154.

1812 births
1892 deaths
Austrian military personnel
Barons of Austria
Mexican Empire
19th century in Mexico
Paseo de la Reforma